Ballet Rejoice is a pre-professional Christian dance company in Rocklin, California.

Company members
 Tessa White, Artistic Director
 Tessa Earl, Founder
 Rowan Denham Sommer, Founding Member

External links
 

Placer County, California
Rejoice, Ballet
Dance in California